The 2017 season is Warriors' 22nd consecutive season in the top flight of Singapore football and in the S.League. Along with the S.League, the club will also compete in the Prime League, the Singapore Cup and the Singapore League Cup.

Squad

S.League squad

Prime League squad

Coaching staff

Transfers

Pre-season transfers
Source

In

Out

Mid-season transfer

In

Out

Friendlies

Pre-season friendlies

Asia Clubs Pre-season Championship 2017

In season friendlies

Post season friendlies

Team statistics

Appearances and goals

Numbers in parentheses denote appearances as substitute.

Competitions

Overview

S.League

Singapore Cup

Singapore TNP League Cup

Group matches

Knock out Stage

References

Warriors FC seasons
Singaporean football clubs 2017 season